Guangji Bridge (simplified Chinese: 广济桥; traditional Chinese: 廣濟橋; pinyin: Guǎng Jì Qiáo; literally "Great Charity Bridge") could be:

 Guangji Bridge (Chaozhou), in Chaozhou, Guangdong, China.
 Guangji Bridge (Hangzhou), in Hangzhou, Zhejiang, China.
 Guangji Bridge (Fenghua), in Fenghua, Zhejiang, China.
 Guangji Bridge (Beijing), in Beijing, China.